This is the discography of Malaysian singer-songwriter Najwa Latif. It consists of an extended play, nine singles (including three as a featured artist), two promotional singles and eighteen music videos (including six as a featured artist).

Albums

EPs

Singles

As main artist

As featured artist

Promotional singles

Other appearances

Music videos

1As featured artist.
This list does not include music video teasers, behind-the-scenes or the-making-of music videos, live acoustic sessions and live performances.

References

Discographies of Malaysian artists